Piles is a municipality in the comarca of Safor in the Valencian Community, Spain.

One of the watchtowers to defend Valencia against north-African forces was built in Piles 1577.

References 

Municipalities in the Province of Valencia
Safor